UCH may refer to:

 Chien Hsin University of Science and Technology in Taoyuan, Taiwan
 United Christian Hospital in Kwun Tong, Hong Kong
 University College Hospital or University College London Hospital (UCLH)

See also
 Uch (disambiguation)

es: